URO, Vehículos Especiales, S.A. (UROVESA)  is a Spanish heavy vehicle manufacturer based in Santiago de Compostela, Galicia. It is best known for the production of the URO VAMTAC, a Humvee-like four-wheel drive motor vehicle, and URO trucks.

History
The company was founded in 1981 by a group of former employees of IPV. Since 1984, they are an official supplier to the Spanish Army - who currently have over 1,000 URO vehicles.

In 1991 the subsidiary UROMAC was created, based in Castropol, Asturias manufactures forklift trucks and dump trucks.

Models

References

External links
 UROVESA Official site
 UROMAC Official site

Companies based in Galicia (Spain)
Vehicle manufacturing companies established in 1981
Truck manufacturers of Spain

es:UROVESA
gl:Uro (automoción)
pl:URO